The Nanny is an American television sitcom that aired for six seasons on CBS from 1993 to 1999. Created and produced by Fran Drescher and Peter Marc Jacobson, the series starred Drescher as Fran Fine, a Queens native who is hired by widower Maxwell "Max" Sheffield (Charles Shaughnessy) to be the nanny of his three children Margaret (Nicholle Tom), Brighton (Benjamin Salisbury), and Grace (Madeline Zima). The series also starred Lauren Lane as C.C. Babcock, Max's business associate, and Daniel Davis as Niles, the family's butler.

Series overview

Episodes

Season 1 (1993–94)

Season 2 (1994–95)

Season 3 (1995–96)

Season 4 (1996–97)

Season 5 (1997–98)

Season 6 (1998–99)

Notes

References

External links 

episodes
Lists of American sitcom episodes

it:La tata#Episodi